The 2012 election for 7th  Head of Government of the Federal District in Mexico was held on Sunday, July 1, 2012. Outgoing Head of Government Marcelo Ebrard, who has held the office since 2006, of the Party of the Democratic Revolution (PRD) is term-limited and may not seek re-election.

The Federal District head of government election coincides with the 2012 Mexican presidential and general elections.

Candidates

References

2012 elections in Mexico
Federal District of Mexico
Head of Government
Politics of Mexico City
July 2012 events in Mexico